This article covers the Japanese garrisons on the by-passed Pacific islands from 1944 to 1945, including the Japanese mandated territory of the South Seas Mandate.

South Pacific detachment

Commander-in-Chief of the South Pacific Detachment
Boshiro Hosogaya: the Governor of the South Seas Mandate, also the Commander-in-Chief of the South Pacific Detachment. He represented the Japanese government and the Imperial Japanese Navy and held great power in the territory.

Marshall Islands Unit

Kwajalein Atoll Detachment
Japanese positions at Kwajalein, Wotje, and Eniwetok (Enewetak) and Roi-Namur Atolls (3,600 Japanese defenders)

Kwajalein Atoll Fortress

Japanese Army units
Colonel Aso: Commanded 2nd Battalion and 1st Sea-mobile Brigade

Eniwetok Atoll Fortress

Japanese Army units
First Lieut. Ichikawa: Led Tank Company/1st Sea-mobile Brigade

Mili Atoll Fortress
Mili

Japanese Navy units
66th Guard Unit (1,200 men), Captain Masanari Shiga
Detachment of 4th Establishment Department (1,200 men)
Total: 2,045 men

Japanese Army units
1st South-Seas Detachment (740 men)
107th Infantry Regiment (1,500 men)
Total: 2,237 men

Wotje Atoll Fortress
Wotje

Japanese Navy units
64th Guard Unit (1,000 men), Captain Shinichi Yoshimi
Chitose Air Unit (1,000 men)
Establishment Department (900 men)
Total: 2,959 men

Equipment
6 × 150 mm cannons
2 × 120 mm cannons
5 × 150 mm howitzers
6 × 127 mm AA guns

Japanese Army units
Wotje Unit of 1st South-Seas Detachment (225 men)
Wotje remainders of 2nd Battalion/2nd Mobile-Sea Brigade (199 men) led by Colonel Aso
Wojte Armor Group-2nd Battalion/1st Sea-mobile Brigade
Total: 424 men

Maleolap Atoll Fortress
Maloelap Atoll

Japanese Navy units
63rd Guard Unit (1,095 men), Rear Admiral Shoichi Kamada
252nd, 752nd, 755th Air Units (890 men)
Detachment of 4th Establishment Department (822 men)
Total: 2,940 men

Equipment
6 15 cm cannons
2 12 cm cannons
4 15 cm howitzers
2 field guns
1 regimental gun
10 127 mm AA guns

Japanese Army units
6th Company/1st Mobile-Sea Brigade (209 men)
7th Company/122nd Infantry Regiment (181 men)
Total: 389 men

Jaluit Island Fortress

Japanese Navy
62nd Guard Unit (547 men), Captain Nisuke Masuda
4th Establishment Department
Construction Unit
Air Unit
Total: 1,584 men

Japanese Army units
2nd Battalion/1st South-Seas Detachment (727 men)
Total: 727 men

Mereyon Island Fortress

Japanese Army units
50th Independent Mixed Brigade (3,404 men), Major-General Katsumi Kitamura
331st to 335th Independent Infantry Battalions
Tank Unit (9 Type 95 Light Tanks)
Artillery Unit (4 field guns, 8 100 mm howitzers)
AA Gun Unit (4 Type 88 75 mm AA Guns)
Engineer Unit
Signal Unit
Hospital
Total: 3,404 men

Japanese Navy units
44th Guard Unit (1,411 men), Commander Yoshinobu Miyata
216th Construction Unit (978 men)
Detachment of 4th Establishment Department (616 men)
Air Unit (85 men)
other (131 men)
Total: 3,221 men
50th Independent Mixed Brigade was reorganized in May 1944, from the following units on Mereyon; South-Seas 5th Detachment, 7th Detachment Unit (from 24th Division), 3rd Company/52nd AA Gun Battalion.

Caroline Islands Detachment

Ponape Island Fortress

Japanese Navy units
42nd Guard Unit (600-900 men), Captain Jun Naito
3rd Detachment of 4th Signal Unit (36 men)
Ponape Detachment of 4th Establishment Department (300 men)
Total: 2,000 men

Equipment
8 150 mm naval guns
8 80 mm naval guns
2 80 mm AA guns
2 127 mm AA guns

Japanese Army units
52nd Independent Mixed Brigade (3,322 men), Lieutenant General Masao Watanabe
342nd to 345th Independent Infantry Battalions
Tank Unit (9 Type 95 Light Tanks)
Artillery Unit (6 Type 38 75 mm Field Guns)
Engineer Unit
Signal Unit
Detachment of 107th Infantry Regiment (2,173 men)
2nd Battalion
3 Infantry Mortar Companies (12 Type 97 81 mm Infantry Mortars each)
Machine Cannon Company(6 Type 98 20 mm AA Machine Cannons)
Tank Company (9 Light Tanks)
Total: 5,984 men
52nd Independent Mixed Brigade was reorganized in May 1944, from the following units on Ponape; 3rd South-Seas Detachment, 2nd Battalion/5th Independent Mixed Regiment.

Kusaie Island Force

Kusaie Island Fortress

Japanese Army units
2nd South-Seas Detachment(1,901 men)-Lieutenant-General Yoshikazu Harada
Detachment HQ
Three Battalions
Tank Company (9 Type 95 Light Tanks)
Engineer Company
107th Infantry Regiment (1,910 men)
Regimental HQ
1st Battalion:
Battalion HQ
4 Infantry Companies
Artillery Company (2 80 mm Armstrong naval guns)
Mountain Gun Battalion (4 Type 94 Mountain Guns)
Infantry Gun Company (2 47 mm AT guns, 6 37 mm AT guns)
Infantry Mortar Company (8 infantry mortars)
Total: 3,811 men

Japanese Navy units
Kusaie Detachment of 42nd Guard Unit (119 men)
Detachment of 4th Signal Unit (24 men)
Detachment of 4th Establishment Department (640 men)
Total: 700 men

Mortlock Island Detachment

Mortlock Island Fortress

Japanese Army units
4th South-Seas Detachment (700 men), Colonel Masatake Tobita
Detachment HQ
3 Infantry Companies
MG Company (8 Type 92 HMGs)
Infantry Gun Company (4 infantry mortars, 4 AT guns)
Tank Company (6 Medium Tanks)
Detachment of 51st Independent Mixed Brigade (132 men)
Total: 753 men

Japanese Navy units
Detachment of 41st Guard Unit (250 men)
2 200 mm naval cannons
8 AA machine cannons
4th Meteorology Unit
Air Base Crew
Total: 257 men

Enderby Island Unit

Enderby Island Fortress

Japanese Army units
11th Independent Mixed Regiment (2,769 men), Colonel Tatsuo Yasui
Regimental HQ
1st Battalion (4 infantry guns, 2 mountain guns, 2 47 mm AT guns, 2 37 mm AT guns)
2nd Battalion (2 infantry guns, 2 AT guns)
3rd Battalion (2 infantry guns, 2 AT guns)
Artillery Unit (8 field guns, 4 100 mm howitzers)
Engineer Unit
AA Gun Unit (6 Type 88 75 mm AA Guns)
Signal Unit
Total: 1,010 men

Japanese Navy units
Detachment of 41st Guard Unit
Total: 243 men
The 1st and 2nd Battalions and some parts of the 11th Independent Mixed Regiment were moved to Truk due to the food shortage on the island. 335 Imperial Japanese Army soldiers and 211 Imperial Japanese Navy soldiers on the island died of hunger and an illness and 675 IJA soldiers and 32(!) IJN soldiers returned home from the island.

Imperial Army Headquarters (Carolines)

Truk Island Unit
Japanese base at Truk, the pivot of the Japanese position in the South Seas Mandate. Truk was a huge naval complex, the "Pearl Harbor of the Japanese". It had been under construction since 1937.

Japanese aviation facilities was Dublon (Tonoas), 
Moen (Weno),and Eten Atolls.

Truk District Group
Under 52nd Division Commander
LtGen Shunzaburo Mugikura
Nucleus: 52nd Division
51st Independent Mixed Brigade
52nd Independent Mixed Brigade

Truk Atoll Fortress

Japanese Navy units
4th Fleet HQ - Vice Admiral Chuichi Hara
4th Base Force HQ
41st, 43rd, 47th, 48th Guard Units
Total: 27,856 men

Equipment (1942)
18 80 mm naval guns
10 150 mm naval guns
280 mm AA guns
12 127 mm AA guns

Japanese Army units
31st Army HQ (128 men), Lieutenant-General Shunzaburo Mugikura
52nd Division
Divisional HQ (298 men)
69th Infantry Regiment (2,694 men)
150th Infantry Regiment (2,136 men)
Tank Unit (103 men)*
Signal Unit (241 men)
Transport Unit (105 men)
Sea Transport Unit (1,132 men)
Ordnance Service Unit (117 men)
Field Hospital (649 men)
51st Independent Mixed Brigade (4,789 men), Major-General Kanenobu Ishuin
Brigade HQ
336th to 341st Independent Infantry Battalions
1st Artillery Unit
Engineer Unit
AA Gun Unit
Signal Unit
11th Independent Mixed Regiment (1,366 men)
9th Independent Engineer Regiment (483 men)
58th Anchorage HQ
Total: 16,737 men
Tank unit had no tanks, because the transport ship was sunk by air raid.

Japanese Yap Island Detachment

Yap Island Fortress

Japanese Army units
49th Independent Mix Brigade (4,066 men), Colonel Daihachi Itoh
Brigade HQ
323rd to 330th Independent Infantry Battalions
Artillery Unit (8 Type 95 75 mm Field Guns, 14 Type 91 100 mm Howitzers)
AA Gun Unit (4 Type 88 75 mm AA Guns)
Engineer Unit
Signal Unit
Special Field Hospital
Total: 4,423 men

Japanese Navy units
46th Guard Unit (1,000 men), Captain Masamichi Tanaka
205th Construction Unit (1,000 men)
Total: 1,494 men
49th Independent Mix Brigade was reorganized in May 1944, from the 4th Detachment Unit (from 12th Division) on Yap Island. The last Japanese garrison surrendered at Fais Island in the Yap group.

Palau Island Detachment

Palau District Group
Under 14th Division Commander
LtGen Sadao Inoue
nucleus: 14th Division
49th and 53rd Independent Mixed Brigades.

Palau Islands (Peleliu) Unit
There were 10,700 Japanese defenders under Colonel Kunio Nakagawa
Tank Unit/14th Division-Captain Amano

Babelthuap Island Fortress (Palau Islands)

Japanese Army units
14th Division - Lieutenant-General Sadao Inoue
53rd Independent Mixed Brigade (6,000 men), Major-General Takeo Yamaguchi
347th to 351st Independent Infantry Battalions
Artillery Unit
Engineer Unit
Transport Unit/1st Sea-Mobile Brigade (1,338 men)
Tank Unit/6th South-Seas Detachment (7 Light Tanks)
Palau Branch of 3rd Ship Transport HQ (1,480 men)
57th Line of Communication Area Unit (753 men)
Total: 21,449 men

Japanese Navy units
30th Special Base Force (2,500 men), Vice-Admiral Kenmi Itoh
Total: 8,286 men
Less 2nd Infantry Regiment, 1st Battalion/59th Infantry Regiment, Tank Unit.

Mariana Islands Unit
Mariana Islands unit (Saipan and Tinian)

Commanders in Mariana Islands Units
Saipan was defended by 29,662 Japanese army and navy troops under Lt. General Yoshitsuga Saito and Admiral Chuichi Nagumo

Northern Mariana District Group

Saipan and Tinian Island area
under 43rd Division Commander, LtGen Yoshitsugu Saito
nucleus: 43rd Division,
47th Independent Mixed Brigade.
5th Infantry Regiment(Tinian Island), Colonel Keishi Ogata
9th Tank Regiment(Saipan), Colonel Goshima
Yokosuka 1st SNLF
55th Guard Unit
Tank Unit/18th Infantry Regiment(Tinian), First Lieut. Sikamura
Artillery Unit/47th Independent Mixed Brigade, Captain Yamane
3rd Independent Mountain Gun Regiment, Lt.Col. Nakajima
Artillery Battalion/135th Infantry Regiment, Major Aikawa
Artillery Battalion/136th Infantry Regiment, Major Yabuki

Japanese Navy units
Navy Artillery
4 200 mm Naval Guns
14 150 mm Naval Guns
3 140 mm Naval Guns
4 120 mm Naval Guns
4 80 mm Naval Guns

Pagan Island Fortress

Japanese Army units
9th Independent Mixed Regiment (1,995 men), Colonel Umahachi Tenba
Total: 2,150 men

Japanese Navy units
Guard unit (300 men). The unit is unknown.
Total: 344 men

Rota Island Fortress

Japanese Army units
10th Independent Mixed Brigade (947 men), Major Shigeo Imagawa
Total: 1,031 men

Japanese Navy unit
Detachment of 41st Guard Unit (600 men). It was detached from 56th Guard Unit on Tinian. After destruction of 56th Guard Unit, the command of the detachment on Rota was changed to 41st Guard Unit on Truk.
Total: 1,954 men

Guam Island Fortress

Southern Marianas District Group
The Japanese defenders of this largest Marianas group island numbered some 19,000 troops under Lt. General Hyo Takashina

Guam Island area
29th Division Commander, LtGen Hyo Takashina
Units:
29th Division
48th Independent Mixed Brigade.
1st Company/9th Tank Regiment, First Lieut. Sachi
2nd Company/9th Tank Regiment, Captain Tsunenari Sato
Tank Unit/29th Division, Captain Hideo Sato

Japanese detachment in Makin Atoll (1943)

Butaritari Fortress

Japanese Navy units
5th Special Base Force (Makin detachment), Lt.j.g. Seizo Ishikawa
3rd Special Base Force (Makin detachment)
Makin Armor Detachment of 3rd Special Base Force (3 Type 95 Light Tanks)
Total: 284 troops
Aviation Personnel
Total: 100 units
4th Fleet Construction Unit
Total: 276 men

All units complete the total of: 798 men under command of Lieutenant j.g. Seizo Ishikawa. Most of aviation or labor units had no combat training and were not assigned weapons or a battle station, also the number of actual armed combat troops on Makin was no more than 300 men.

Makin Naval Base:
A surface vessel and submarine port, with naval coastal defenses, possessed capacity to receive some Kawanishi H8K "Emily" flying boat bombers, Nakajima A6M2-N "Rufe" hydrofighters and Aichi E13A1 "Jake" recon-hydroplanes.

Nauru Island Detachment

Nauru Island Fortress

Japanese Navy units
67th Guard Unit (1,367 men), Captain Hisayuki Soeda
Yokosuka 2nd SNLF (769 men)
Nauru Special Construction Unit/4th Construction
Department (2,120 men)
Total: 4,256 men

Equipment
4 150 mm Naval Guns
4 80 mm Naval Guns
4 Twin 127 mm AA Guns
12 25 mm MGs
10 130 mm MGs

Ocean Island Unit

Ocean Island Fortress

Japanese Navy unit
Ocean Detachment of 67th Guard Unit (760 men)

Gilbert Islands Detachment

Tarawa Atoll Fortress

Japanese Navy units
Makin, Apamama, Betio, and Tarawa Atolls 
Special Naval Landing-Rear Admiral Keiji Shimbasaka
Sasebo 7th Special Naval Landing Force (2,619 men at command of Rear-Admiral Takeo Sugai) also 4,800 naval troops.
Tank Unit/Sasebo 7th SNLF (14 Type 95 Light Tanks) Commanded by Ensign Ohtani

Wake Island Detachment

Wake Island Fortress

Japanese Navy units
65th Guard Unit (2,000 men), Captain Shigematsu Sakaibara
Total: 2,200 men

Equipment
4 twin 127 mm AA guns
4 80 mm AA guns
5 captured US 3-inch AA guns
2 captured US 5-inch naval guns
4 200 mm naval guns
4 150 mm naval guns
8 120 mm naval guns

Japanese Army units
13th Independent Mixed Regiment (1,939 men), Colonel Shigeji Chikamori
Regimental HQ
1st Battalion
2nd Battalion
Artillery Company
1st Tank Unit
2nd Tank Unit

Equipment
11 37 mm AT guns
4 47 mm AT guns
3 regimental guns
4 field guns
5 infantry guns
9 Type 95 Light Tanks
4 captured US 3-inch AA guns
4 captured US 5-inch naval guns
Total: 1,939 men
13th Independent Mixed Regiment was reorganized in May 1944, from the following units on Wake Island; 3rd South-Sea Garrison Unit, 1st Battalion/5th Independent Mixed Regiment and 16th Tank Regiment.

Marcus Island Detachment

Marcus Island Fortress

Equipment

Japanese Navy units
Minami-tori-shima Guard Unit-Rear-Admiral Masata Matsubara
Total: 742 men

Japanese Army units
12th Independent Mixed Regiment, Colonel Yoshiichi Sakata
Three Infantry Battalions
Field Gun Company (3 Type 38 75 mm Field Guns)
Tank Company (9 Type 95 Light Tanks)
Signal Company
Total: 2,005 men

Ogasawara Island Detachment

Ogasawara (Bonins) District Group

Japanese Army units
Under 109th Division Commander (LtGen Tadamichi Kuribayashi)
Nucleus: 109th Division (Iwo Jima)
Lieut. Colonel Nishi led 26th Tank Regiment
2nd Mixed Brigade Artillery Group HQ, Col. Kaido
Artillery Unit/2nd Mixed Brigade, Major Maeda
Artillery Battalion/145th Infantry Regiment, Captain Matsuda
20th Independent Mortar Battalion, Captain Mizutari
2nd Middle Infantry Mortar Battalion, Major Nakao
3rd Middle Infantry Mortar Battalion, Major Kobayashi
Rocket Artillery Company, 1st Lt. Yokoyama
1st Independent Infantry Mortar Company, 1st Lt. Yamaki
Artillery Company/26th Tank Regiment, 1st Lt. Kishi

Japanese Navy units
Navy Artillery
4 150 mm Naval Guns
4 140 mm Naval Guns
7 120 mm Naval Guns
8 120 mm Short Naval Guns

Notes

References
 

 
Palau in World War II
South Pacific Mandate
South Pacific Mandate
South Seas Mandate